Professor of Divinity may refer to academics in the field of theology (see divinity) and in particular to chairs in the UK as in the following:

Ely Professor of Divinity, Cambridge
Professor of Divinity, Glasgow
Professor of Divinity and Biblical Criticism, Glasgow
Gresham Professor of Divinity, Gresham College, London
Lady Margaret's Professor of Divinity, Cambridge
Lady Margaret Professor (Oxford)
Lightfoot Professor of Divinity, Durham
Norris-Hulse Professor of Divinity, Cambridge
Regius Professor of Divinity, Cambridge and Oxford 
Van Mildert Professor of Divinity, Durham